

Boundaries
Below are separate lists of countries and dependencies with their land boundaries, and lists of which countries and dependencies border oceans and major seas.  The first short section describes the borders or edges of continents and oceans/major seas.  Disputed areas are not considered.

Continents
(Notes: Dependencies and islands remote from continental land masses are not considered and are excluded from this list section; thus only continental land borders are considered.   The only countries listed either straddle continents or are on a continent border.)

Section Key: 

( * ) = represents a country that crosses a continental land border

Countries
(Notes: Dependencies are excluded from this section.  See below.  Only land boundaries are considered; maritime boundaries are excluded; see the List of countries and territories by maritime boundaries.   Disputed territories are not considered, other than the inclusion by necessity, in a neutral fashion, of Western Sahara.)

Section Key: 

( * ) = represents a sea (or other body of water)'s parent ocean; also it may represent a dependency's parent country

(Note: All official and unofficial claims by countries and/or governments on the continent of Antarctica are excluded from this section list.)

Dependencies
(Note:  This section lists only dependencies with land boundaries)

Section Key: 

( * ) = represents a sea (or other body of water)'s parent ocean

Oceans

Section Key: 

( * ) = represents a dependency's parent country

(Note: Seas are excluded from this list section.)

Seas

Section Key: 

( * ) = represents a dependency's parent country

(Note: This section only includes large bodies of water that are designated as a "sea" by a large portion of geographers worldwide.)

See also
List of artificial islands
List of countries and territories by land and maritime borders
List of countries and territories by land borders
List of divided islands
Lists of islands
List of islands by area
List of islands by population

External links
CIA - The World Factbook
Google Maps
HRW World Atlas
Joshua Calder's World Island Info
TopoZone
World Maps

Political and geographic borders
Political and geographic borders
A
Political